Anemone Geyser is a geyser in the Upper Geyser Basin of Yellowstone National Park in the United States. Anemone is actually two closely related geysers. The larger of the two is known as Big or North Anemone while the smaller is known as Little or South Anemone. The two geysers were named after the anemone flower by the Hague Party in 1904. Both vents have a pale yellow color and shape similar to the flower.

Geology 
Water can be heard rising in the crater prior to eruption. After an eruption, the water quickly and noisily retreats into the crater.

Little Anemone has less vigorous but longer-lasting eruptions than Big Anemone. Interval between eruptions can vary from 6 to 35 minutes, and eruptions can last from less than a minute to more than 30 minutes.

On occasion, Little Anemone has near non-stop activity. This causes Big Anemone to have very long intervals and weak eruptions. The Anemone geysers are also part of the weekly Geyser Hill wave, it increases and decreases their interval and duration over the course of a week or multiples of one week.

See also
 List of Yellowstone geothermal features

References

External links
 

Geysers of Wyoming
Geothermal features of Teton County, Wyoming
Geothermal features of Yellowstone National Park
Geysers of Teton County, Wyoming